The miR-24 microRNA precursor is a small non-coding RNA molecule that regulates gene expression.  microRNAs are transcribed as ~70 nucleotide precursors and subsequently processed by the Dicer enzyme to give a mature ~22 nucleotide product.  In this case the mature sequence comes from the 3' arm of the precursor. The mature products are thought to have regulatory roles through complementarity to mRNA. miR-24 is conserved in various species, and is clustered with miR-23 and miR-27, on human chromosome 9  and 19. Recently, miR-24 has been shown to suppress expression of two crucial cell cycle control genes, E2F2 and Myc in hematopoietic differentiation  and also to promote keratinocyte differentiation by repressing actin-cytoskeleton regulators PAK4, Tsk5 and ArhGAP19.

Targets of miR-24

 Lal et al. suggested that miR-24 suppresses the tumor suppressor p16(INK4a).
 Lal et al. reported that mi-24 inhibits cell proliferation by targeting E2F2, MYC via binding to "seedless" 3'UTR microRNA recognition elements.
 Amelio I. et al. suggest that miR-24 regulates keratinocyte differentiation, controlling actin-cytoskeleton dynamics via PAK4, Tsk5 and ArhGAP19 repression. 
 Wang et al. have shown that miR-24 reduces the mRNA and protein levels of human ALK4 by targeting the 3'-untranslated region of mRNA.
 Mishra et al. suggest that miR-24 targets the DHFR gene.
 miR-24-1, also known as miR-189, targets SLITRK1.

References

External links
 
 miRBase family MIPF0000041

MicroRNA
MicroRNA precursor families